Mariaesthela Vilera (born 26 December 1988 in Valle de la Pascua) is a Venezuelan track cyclist. At the 2012 Summer Olympics, she competed in the Women's team sprint for the national team.

She also competed at the 2015 Pan American Games.

Career results
2014
1st  Team Sprint, South American Games (with Daniela Larreal)
Pan American Track Championships
2nd  Team Sprint (with Daniela Larreal)
3rd  500m Time Trial
2nd Keirin, Sprintermeeting
3rd Sprint, Prova Internacional de Anadia
2016
2nd Sprint, Copa Venezuela

References

External links
 

1988 births
Living people
Venezuelan female cyclists
Venezuelan track cyclists
Olympic cyclists of Venezuela
Cyclists at the 2012 Summer Olympics
Cyclists at the 2015 Pan American Games
People from Valle de la Pascua
Pan American Games medalists in cycling
Pan American Games gold medalists for Venezuela
South American Games gold medalists for Venezuela
South American Games medalists in cycling
Competitors at the 2014 South American Games
Medalists at the 2011 Pan American Games
21st-century Venezuelan women